Matt Sharp is the self-titled debut from former Weezer bassist and The Rentals frontman Matt Sharp. It was released in 2004 via Boompa Records.

The album does not employ electric guitar, synths, or percussion. Lap steel, acoustic guitar, piano, and organ are the only accompaniment to Sharp's vocals. The album was recorded in Tennessee.

Critical reception
The Detroit Metro Times called it "plaintive music so utterly anguished yet hauntingly beautiful it’s almost too painful to listen to."

Track listing

References

2004 albums
Matt Sharp albums